Valenzuela flavidus is a species of Psocoptera from Caeciliusidae family that can be found in the United Kingdom, and sometimes Ireland. They are also common in Austria, Azores, Belgium, Bulgaria, Canary Islands, Croatia, Denmark, Finland, France, Germany, Greece, Hungary, Italy, Latvia, Luxembourg, Norway, Poland, Portugal, Romania, Spain, Sweden, Switzerland, and the Netherlands. It is also widespread in Near East. The species are  yellowish-black coloured.

Habitat
The species feeds on various microflora that grow on trees including:
Alder
Ash
Beech
Berberis
Birch
Blackthorn
Broom
Elder
Elm
Hawthorn
Hazel
Ivy
Laurel
Oak
Pine
Poplar
Sallow
Spindle
Sycamore
Sea buckthorn
Willow
It also likes to feed on plants like guelder rose and rhododendron and rowan berries.

References

Caeciliusidae
Insects described in 1836
Psocoptera of Europe